Yoon Seung-won (born 11 February 1995) is a South Korean football player. Until 2014, he was known as Yoon Hyun-oh.

Club career 
Yoon joined FC Seoul in 2014 and made his league debut against Jeonbuk Hyundai Motors on 3 November 2016.

Club career statistics

References

External links
 
 Yoon Seung-won – National Team stats at KFA 

1995 births
Living people
Association football midfielders
South Korean footballers
South Korea under-20 international footballers
South Korea under-23 international footballers
FC Seoul players
K League 1 players